Krasian Kolev (Bulgarian: Красиан Колев; born 18 January 2004) is a Bulgarian footballer who plays as a winger for Botev Plovdiv.

Career
Born in Razgrad, Krasian moved to Septemvri Sofia at age of 14. Kolev scored his first league goal on top level on 21 August 2022 in a match against Beroe Stara Zagora. On 29 December 2022 he moved to Botev Plovdiv for an undisclosed transfer fee, which was a record fee for Septemvri leaving player. He made his debut for the team on 4 March 2023 in a league match against Cherno More Varna scoring the first goal for the 2:1 win.

International career
In September 2022 Kolev was called up for Bulgaria U19 for the 2023 UEFA European Under-19 Championship qualification matches against Azerbaijan U19, Luxembourg U19 and Turkey U19.

Career statistics

Club

References

External links
 

2004 births
Living people
Bulgarian footballers
Bulgaria youth international footballers
FC Septemvri Sofia players
Botev Plovdiv players
First Professional Football League (Bulgaria) players
Association football midfielders